Alexandros Vasilakis (born 8 August 1979) is a retired Greek handball player. He was a member of the Greece men's national handball team, playing as a right back. He was a part of the team at the 2004 Summer Olympics.

References

External links 
 
 
 

1979 births
Living people
Greek male handball players
Olympic handball players of Greece
Handball players at the 2004 Summer Olympics
Artists from Corfu